One Two Three Four is the first 7" extended play by Australian rock band the Saints. The EP contained two cover versions of other artists' work and two re-recorded tracks which originally appeared on their debut album (I'm) Stranded. It was originally released in the UK as both a single disc EP and a double 7" with a gatefold shelve. An Australian edition of the EP appeared in the following month. Australian musicologist, Ian McFarlane, felt their versions of "Lipstick on Your Collar" (originally by Connie Francis) and "River Deep – Mountain High" (originally by Ike and Tina Turner) were "ragged but inspired".

The complete EP was issued on CD in 2007 as bonus tracks to (I'm) Stranded.

Track listing

Single disc EP

Two-disc 7"

Disc 1

Disc 2

Personnel
The Saints
Chris Bailey - vocals
Ed Kuepper - guitar
Ivor Hay - drums
Kym Bradshaw - bass guitar

Catalogue numbers

Australia (EP): EMI EMI 11597
UK (EP): Harvest HAR5137
UK (2 Disc 7"): Harvest 2HAR5137

References 

The Saints (Australian band) EPs
1977 debut EPs
Harvest Records EPs